Sebastian Wiktor Walukiewicz (born 5 April 2000) is a Polish professional footballer who plays as a defender for  club Empoli, on loan from Cagliari. He represents the Poland national team.

Club career

Pogoń Szczecin
In 2017, Walukiewicz joined Pogoń Szczecin from Legia Warsaw II. He made his Ekstraklasa debut on 7 April 2018 against his former club, Legia Warszawa, playing 8 minutes in a 3–0 away defeat.

Cagliari
On 8 January 2019, Walukewicz joined Cagliari Calcio on a 4.5-year contract with club. He returned to Pogoń Szczecin on loan until the end of the season.

Loan to Empoli
On 1 September 2022, he joined Serie A club Empoli on loan until the end of the season with an option and a conditional obligation to buy.

International career 
On 7 October 2020, he made his international debut in the friendly match against Finland. Four days later, he made his competitive debut, playing a full game in the Nations League 0–0 home draw against Italy.

References

External links

2000 births
Living people
Sportspeople from Gorzów Wielkopolski
Polish footballers
Poland youth international footballers
Poland under-21 international footballers
Poland international footballers
Association football defenders
Legia Warsaw II players
Legia Warsaw players
Pogoń Szczecin players
Cagliari Calcio players
Empoli F.C. players
III liga players
Ekstraklasa players
Serie A players
Polish expatriate footballers
Expatriate footballers in Italy
Polish expatriate sportspeople in Italy